Minimum maintenance requirement may refer to:
Design of a building to minimise the requirement for maintenance through facility management
The minimum amount of financial collateral required: see Margin (finance)